

J

References

Lists of words